Ogden Driskill (born 1959) is a Republican member of the Wyoming Senate, representing the 1st district  since 2011. Senate District 1 is the largest  in Wyoming in geographic terms. He is a member of the Wyoming Senate Wyoming Wildlife Taskforce, Wyoming Gaming Commission, State Building Commission Liaison, Energy Council, Select Water Committee, Select Committee on Capitol Financing & Investments, Senate Rules & Procedure, and Management Council. He is also the Chair of the Senate Corporations, Elections, & Political Subdivisions Committee.

References

External links
Ogden Driskill for Senate District 1 official campaign site
Profile from Ballotpedia

|-

|-

21st-century American politicians
Living people
People from Crook County, Wyoming
Republican Party Wyoming state senators
Year of birth missing (living people)